Parland is a surname. Notable people with the surname include:

 Alfred Parland (1842–1919), Russian architect
 David Parland (1970–2013), Swedish musician
 Oscar Parland (1912–1997), Finnish Swedish author, translator, and psychiatrist

See also
 McParland